The 1907–08 NYU Violets men's basketball team represented New York University during the 1907–08 college men's basketball season. The team finished with an overall record of 7–5.

Schedule

|-

References

NYU Violets men's basketball seasons
NYU
NYU
NYU